Reason Studios (formerly known as Propellerhead Software) is a music software company, based in Stockholm, Sweden, and founded in 1994. It produces the studio emulation Reason.

History 
Propellerhead Software was founded in 1994 by Ernst Nathorst-Böös, Marcus Zetterquist and Peter Jubel, who still hold prominent positions within the company. Their first release was ReCycle, a sample loop editor that could change the tempo of a loop without affecting the pitch. The export medium was Propellerhead's own REX format. ReCycle was launched in conjunction with Steinberg, who marketed it as a companion to Cubase, as it brought a simple way of gaining control over tempo and timing of audio loops.

In 1997, Propellerhead released ReBirth RB-338, a step based, programmable sequencer which emulated classic Roland instruments commonly associated with techno: two TB-303 Bass Line synthesizers and a TR-808. A TR-909 drum machine was added in version 2.0. It was hailed as an affordable alternative to buying old, unreliable hardware devices. Roland Corporation requested that an acknowledgment be added to the ReBirth packaging and splash screen; the unofficial endorsement became a marketing boost for Propellerhead, and they have retained a close relationship with Roland ever since.

ReWire was developed jointly between Propellerhead and Steinberg for use with their Cubase sequencer. Released in 1998, it provided a virtual audio and synchronization connection between Cubase and ReBirth. In January 1999 the protocol was opened for general use by third parties without any license fee, to allow communication between different sequencers.

Propellerhead soon focused their attention on their new product, the award-winning digital audio workstation; Reason. It first released in 2000.

In May 2009, Propellerhead announced a new product, Record. Designed for recording, arrangement and mixing, Record is made along the lines of Reason and continues the tradition of emulating hardware and the rack.

Record emulates a recording studio, with a mixing desk, a rack of virtual instruments and effects, and an audio sequencer (similar to traditional MIDI sequencing.) It is also made to work alongside Reason; if Record is installed on a computer with Reason on it, the modules from Reason will be usable inside of Record.

Released 9 September 2009, Record has been praised for its stability, seamless integration with Reason, and sound quality, and has received a number of awards, including Future Music's Platinum Award, Computer Music Editor's Choice and Performance awards, and the MusicTech Excellence award.

In April 2010, Propellerhead released their first app for mobile platforms; a remake of their ReBirth RB-338 software for the Apple iPhone, iPod Touch and iPad. Developed together with Retronyms, it's a 100% port of the original with added functionality for sharing song files with other iPhone users, zooming and panning.

In July 2011, Propellerhead announced plans for Reason version 6 which includes all the features of Record 1.5. This allowed Propellerhead to discontinue Record and create two different versions of Reason.

In March 2012, Propellerhead announced Rack Extensions and the Rack Extension store, a software architecture that will allow 3rd party developers to use their own instruments and effect devices inside of Reason.  This technology was announced to appear alongside Reason 6.5 as a free update.  Rack Extensions will be sold in an app store similar in a fashion in which Apple Inc. sells applications for the popular iOS platform.  Hosted by Propellerhead Software, developers are free to use their own DSP and existing code to develop instruments and effects for use in Reason.  When purchased, the Rack Extensions appear in Reason as a native Reason instrument or effect module and are privy to all of the features that Reason offers in its native instruments and effect devices.

In April 2017, Propellerhead announced plans to support VST plugins in Reason, starting from version 9.5 

Reason 12 is available as a forever license for $499. Alternatively, users can get Reason 12, with all the instruments, as a subscription service called "Reason+". The subscription service is $19.99 per month.

Name 
The name propellerhead comes from the pejorative term used to deprecate science fiction fans and other technophiles, who are stereotypically drawn wearing propeller beanies. The company is not related to the British electronic music duo Propellerheads.

On 26 August 2019, Propellerhead announced they would change their name to Reason Studios to have a name more closely tied to their core product: Reason.

Online
From early on, Propellerhead used the Internet as both a marketing tool and as a method to communicate with their user base. An alpha version of ReBirth was made available for free download on the Propellerhead website in December 1996, and the company even searched the internet for active users of the TB-303 and sent them invitation emails to try the new software.

The user forum has always been at the forefront of the Propellerhead community, with many employees checking them every day. Allowing users to make requests and suggestions directly to the developers led to the first downloadable ReBirth update in 1997, and still today registered users of Propellerhead software can download updates and much additional content online. In November 2013, the forums were shut down indefinitely due to security concerns with the forum software. On 17 December, they were resurrected with 4 new forum categories: Beginner, Advanced User, Rack Extensions and Post Your Music.

On 16 January 2014, Propellerhead Software announced that they will close down the 15-year-old Reason community forums, shifting online customer interaction to their general social media accounts instead. The unofficial new forum, run by Reason users rather than by Propellerhead, is Reason Talk. Though this is an independent forum, some Propellerhead employees have posted there and the forum hosted the official Reason beta test forum for Reason Version 9.

Products

Reason 
Reason is a digital audio workstation developed for macOS and Windows. The first version was released in 2000. When launched Reason could run on average spec computers and was competitively priced. Reason simulates a recording studio with virtual cables and representations of a subtractive synthesizer, sampler and drum machine. It also has a REX file loop player, a pattern step sequencer and a multitude of effects units. Reason has the ability to create as many instances of each device (limited by compute power) and a simple sequencer for notes and device automation.

Current products other 
 Reason Rack Plugin — Included with the Reason DAW (VST3/AU/AAX) works in all major DAWS.
 Reason+ — Reason Studios Subscription Service. Available since Jan 2021.
ReCycle
Reason Adapted — a cut down version of Reason distributed as part of various software bundles
Figure — an iOS app that utilizes some technology from Reason's Thor synthesizer and Kong drum machine.  It allows users to compose short loops by drawing figures on a touch screen device.
Rebirth for iOS — an iOS app that brings almost all of the functionality of the desktop version of now discontinued ReBirth RB-338.
Reason Compact — an iOS app that combines some of the devices from Reason, most notably the Europa synthesizer
Take — an iOS app for recording song ideas
Thor — an iOS app version of the powerful synthesizer that was introduced in Reason 4

Rack extensions 
 Algorithm FM Synthesizer
 Beat Map Algorhythmic Drummer 
 Complex-1 modular synthesizer 
 Drum Sequencer 
 Fingerpicking Nylon A-list Acoustic Guitarist 
 Friktion Modeled Strings 
 Layers 
 Layers Wave Edition 
 Parsec 
 Polar 
 PolyStep Sequencer 
 Processed Pianos 
 Quad Note Generator 
 Radical Keys 
 Reason Drum Kits 
 Reason Electric Bass 
 Rotor 
 Scenic Hybrid Instrument 
 Umpf Club Drums 
 Umpf Retro Beats 
 Audiomatic Retro Transformer  (included in Reason 9)
 Pulsar - Dual LFO  (included in Reason 9 )
 Radical Piano  (included in Reason since version 10 )
 Synchronous  (included in Reason since version 10 )

Technologies 
REX2
Remote — a communication protocol for use between control surfaces and software applications, first incorporated into Reason 3.
Rack Extensions — a software platform that allows the use of instruments and effects developed by 3rd party companies for use inside of Reason.

ReFills 
ReFills compress sounds, settings and instrument configurations into single files, and are the only way of mass importing additional sounds into Reason.
Reason Pianos
Reason Drum Kits
Reason Soul School
Reason Electric Bass ReFill
RDK Vintage Mono ReFill
ElectroMechanical 2.0 ReFill
Strings ReFill
Abbey Road Keyboards — discontinued, developed with Abbey Road Studios

Discontinued 
ReBirth RB-338 — now reworked as an iOS app
Record (incorporated into Reason as of version 6)
Reload — a utility to import Akai S1000 and S3000 sample CDs into NN-XT ReFills
Europa — a VST implementation of this synthesizer that was introduced in Reason 10. Discontinued with Reason 11 as Reason 11 can now be used as a plugin in other DAWs.
ReWire — discontinued since Reason 11 as it can now be used as a plugin in other DAWs
Balance — an audio interface with optimizations for use with Reason
 A-List Series Rack Extensions — The A-List series of rack extensions were a set of samplebased rack extensions.
 PX7 FM Synthesizer
 A-List Acoustic Guitarist 
 A-list Classic Drummer 
 A-list Power Drummer 
 A-list Studio Drummer 
 Pop Chords A-list Electric Guitarist 
 Power Chords A-list Electric Guitarist 
Reason Intro — an entry level version of Reason with fewer devices
Reason Suite — the full Reason package plus all rack extensions from Reason Studios. Available since version 11

References

External links
Official website
Allihoopa (Closed as of January 17th 2019) 
ReBirth Museum
LearnReason - A Propellerhead Reason website by Matthew Hess
ReasonExperts - A Propellerhead Reason website by Hydlide
Reasonistas - A Propellerhead Reason website and apparel shop by Noel G.
ReasonTalk - A Propellerhead Reason Forum by Kenni
Music production Tips/Techniques/Reviews (Reason,Reason Rack)
ReasonHeads - A Propellerhead Reason Forum by Heigen5

Companies based in Stockholm
Software companies of Sweden
Electronic music organizations
Music equipment manufacturers
Digital audio workstation software
Software synthesizers